State Route 116 (SR 116) is a north–south state highway in the western portion of the U.S. state of Ohio.  The highway's southern terminus is at a signalized intersection with State Route 29, State Route 66, and the eastern terminus of State Route 703 in St. Marys.  Its northern terminus is at another signalized intersection, this time with U.S. Route 127 in the southern end of Van Wert.

Route description

State Route 116 travels through the western Ohio counties of Auglaize and Van Wert.  No portion of this route is included within the  National Highway System, a network of highways deemed most imperative for the nation's economy, mobility and defense.

History
State Route 116's designation was assigned in 1923.  For the first two years of its existence, the routing of State Route 116 included the present routing of State Route 198 from downtown Wapakoneta northwest to State Route 117 east of Spencerville, State Route 117 from that point west to its eastern intersection with State Route 116, and the present alignment of State Route 116 from there to its northern terminus in Van Wert.  In 1925, State Route 116 was re-routed onto its present alignment from State Route 117 south to St. Marys.  Prior to that time, this current segment of State Route 116 was designated as State Route 198.  The former portions of State Route 116 were re-designated as State Route 117 and State Route 198, respectively, at that time.

Major intersections

References

116
Transportation in Auglaize County, Ohio
Transportation in Van Wert County, Ohio